Zakhmi Dil may refer to:

 Zakhmi Dil, a 1981 Indian film
 Zakhmi Dil, a 1994 Indian film directed by Raju Subramaniam